Israel Vibration are a reggae harmony group, originating from Kingston, Jamaica.  Lascelle "Wiss" Bulgin, Albert "Apple Gabriel" Craig, and Cecil "Skelly" Spence all suffered from childhood polio, and went on to be a Jamaican roots reggae group in the 1970s. The trio initially met as children at a rehabilitation center.

History
Bulgin (born 1955), Craig (1955–2020), and Spence (born 1952–2022) first met as children at the Mona Rehabilitation Clinic, all sufferers of polio in the epidemic that spread through Jamaica in the 1950s. Several years later they formed Israel Vibration. Craig attended the Alpha Boys School but ran away at the age of fourteen, living on the streets. Spence was a member of the band Hot Lickers, appearing on Jamaican television with the group at the age of twelve. He also played in the Jamaican wheelchair basketball team but was forced out in 1969 after adopting the Rastafarian faith, something which the three had in common when they were later reunited.

Spence and Craig got together in Kingston and sought out Bulgin, who at the time was working as a tailor. They formed a vocal group, initially adopting the name Israel Vibration Israel Vibrates, soon becoming simply Israel Vibration. They survived on money earned singing in the streets for several years, and in 1975 attempted to launch a recording career at Channel One Studios, but the track they recorded there ("Bad Intention") was not released.

Funding for their first album came in the form of a grant from the Twelve Tribes of Israel branch of Rastafarai after Hugh Booth, a member of the Twelve Tribes, had overheard the three men singing in a wooded area outside Kingston. Apple and Wiss were living in the area, which they had converted into a home. Recorded at the Treasure Isle studio in 1976, their debut release was the single "Why Worry", released on the Twelve Tribes label late that year. The single was successful enough for the group to be offered support slots at shows by artists such as Dennis Brown, Inner Circle, and Bob Marley.

They then began working with producer Tommy Cowan, releasing "The Same Song" (on which they were backed by members of Inner Circle) on his Top Ranking label in 1977, and an album of the same name followed in 1978. The album, and its dub counterpart, Israel Tafari (aka Same Song Dub) were a success internationally, leading to a deal with EMI label Harvest to reissue the album in the UK, the label also releasing a second album, Unconquered People in 1980.

For their third album, Why You So Craven (the title track aimed at their former producer Cowan), they worked with Henry "Junjo" Lawes but disagreements meant that they left the album unfinished, with Lawes getting The Tamlins to complete it.

The group relocated to New York in 1982 to seek professional health care, and escape the growing dancehall movement in Jamaica, but struggled to break through there and they split up. They each attempted to launch solo careers, with Bulgin releasing the Mr Sunshine album in 1985, but by 1987 they decided to relaunch Israel Vibration. Having all been turned down when they approached Gary "Dr. Dread" Himmelfarb, founder of RAS Records, during their solo period, they received a positive response when they approached him as a group. They were flown to Washington, D.C. to record a new album at the Lion and Fox Recording Studios in College Park, Maryland, backed by the Roots Radics. Strength of my Life was the group's fourth album. The band stayed with RAS into the 21st century, releasing more than a dozen albums for the label. 

In 1997, Apple Gabriel left the group to pursue a solo career, releasing the album Another Moses in 1999. Skelly and Wiss continue to record albums and tour the world as Israel Vibration, backed by longtime associates Roots Radics. In December 2014 they were reportedly recording a new album set for release in early 2015. The new album, entitled "Play It Real" was released on 31 March 2015 via Utopia. On March 23rd, 2020, Albert "Apple Gabriel" co-founder and former member of the group died due to 'compilation sickness', earlier reports indicated that Albert was not well for quite some time, this was supposedly due to some of the polio infections left in his body. On a Facebook post on March 7, 2020, he had indicated that he had suffered a stroke. He died on March 23, 2020. On August 26th, 2022, Cecil "Skelly" Spence died of lung cancer.

Discography

Studio albums
 The Same Song (1978), Top Ranking
 Unconquered People (1979), Harvest
 Why You So Craven (1981), Volcano
 Strength of My Life (1988), RAS
 Praises (1990), RAS
 Dub Vibration: Israel Vibration in Dub (1990), RAS
 Forever (1991), RAS
 IV (1993), RAS
 I.V.D.U.B. (1994), RAS
 On the Rock (1995), RAS
 Dub the Rock (1995), RAS
 Israel Dub (1996), RAS
 Free to Move (1996), RAS
 Ras Portraits (1997), RAS
 Pay the Piper (1999), RAS
 Jericho (2000), RAS
 Power of the Trinity (2002)
 Dub Combo (2001), RAS
 Fighting Soldiers (2003)
 Cool and Calm (2005)
 Stamina (2007), Mediacom
 Reggae Knights (2010), Mediacom
 Play It Real (2015), Utopia

Live albums
 Israel Vibration & The Gladiators Live at Reggae Sunsplash (1982)
 Vibes Alive (1992), RAS
Living truth (1999)
 Live Again! (1997), RAS
 Live & Jammin (2003), Nocturne

References

External links
 
 

Jamaican reggae musical groups
Reggae duos
People with polio
Roots Reggae Library